Reignfire is a fictional character and villain appearing in American comic books published by Marvel Comics. The character has appeared in the series X-Force. His original creators were Fabian Nicieza and Matt Broome, who had completely different plans for the villain than what evolved.

Creation history
Originally, Fabian Nicieza had meant for Reignfire to be a time traveling, slightly older, more mentally disturbed version of Sunspot. However, when a later writer John Francis Moore took over the title he changed the original plan and came up with the explanation about the protoplasmic, amorphous origin.

Fictional character biography
After the events of the X-Cutioner's Song crossover event, the Mutant Liberation Front (MLF) was incarcerated and left leaderless. To fill this void came a maniacal being named Reignfire. He liberated four members of the original MLF: Forearm, Reaper, Wildside, and Tempo, and added two more to their ranks: Moonstar and Locus. He charged his team with the mission of killing Henry Peter Gyrich--a man who had always been a thorn in the side of the mutant agenda. However, their attempt was foiled by X-Force and, during the battle, the powers of Locus and Sunspot reacted together in an odd way, teleporting the pair to parts unknown. Before doing so, Reignfire says Cable's real name, a big foreshadowing technique in Nicieza's original plan.

When Reignfire made his presence known, it was noticed how remarkably similar he was to Sunspot, not only in appearance but in powers as well. Since, at this time, Sunspot was missing in action (MIA), that possibility was not ruled out by Cable. His suspicions were revealed when, in the middle of a battle, Reignfire removes his mask to show that he is indeed Roberto.

Cable uses his telepathic powers to forcefully remove/suppress the Reignfire persona in Sunspot, and supposedly succeeds. As an unexpected side effect, Sunspot gathered some knowledge from Cable's mind, including information about Askani -- Cable's religion and language. There were occasional moments when Sunspot would have a mental struggle to suppress evil urges, but for the most part all seems well.

Later, Sunspot goes to visit his friend and former New Mutants teammate Skids in Colorado when the pair is attacked by none other than Locus and Reignfire. Although things once more go awry with Locus' powers when they come in contact with Skids' force field, the mission is generally a success as Sunspot is captured. Once shackled to the wall, Reignfire begins to tell the story of his "real" origin: he was not an evil Sunspot, which many had believed, but a clone of him created from his cellular material. He was once a protoplasmic entity possessed by the Celestials with no real form until Gideon injected a sample of Sunspot's blood into his container. With a set of genetic material to duplicate, the protoplasmic goo began to pattern itself on the DNA sample given to it and thus shared Sunspot's appearance and powers. Another added bonus was the fact that, when he was within close proximity, he could activate a telepathic link with his host and psychically imprint himself onto Sunspot—explaining why Sunspot would sometimes seem to be evil. Reignfire wanted to kill Sunspot, but fails when several of his teammates came to his rescue.

When he next appeared, it was back with the Celestials' ship. X-Force found the ship and the protoplasmic figure inside and, after a battle, Reignfire was crushed to death by a Celestial golem inside of the ship.

Powers and abilities
Since Reignfire was the genetic clone of Sunspot, he shared all of his abilities: absorption rechanneling of solar energy, either within his own body or externally, to create multiple abilities including, super strength, thermal updrafts for flight, projection of heat and light as concussive blasts or in a stream of fiery rain, and the ability to forge a telepathic link with his genetic host and psychically imprint himself onto his brain.

References

External links
Uncannyxmen.net Character Profile on Reignfire

Fictional characters with absorption or parasitic abilities
Fictional characters with fire or heat abilities
Clone characters in comics
Marvel Comics characters with superhuman strength
Marvel Comics mutants
Marvel Comics telepaths
Marvel Comics supervillains